Leucanopsis violascens is a moth of the family Erebidae. It was described by Paul Reich in 1933. It is found in Argentina.

References

External links

violascens
Moths described in 1933